Hip Hop High School (2006) is a novel by American author Alan Lawrence Sitomer. It is the second in the Hoopster Trilogy.

Summary
The book takes place about five years after the events in The Hoopster. It is a story about Andre's younger sister, Theresa Anderson. Theresa begins her sophomore year at a ghetto high school. Her best friend, Cee-Saw, is constantly getting her into trouble, and due to the events of the prequel, Theresa's mother doubts Theresa's potential and expects her to fail. While in school, Theresa faces many challenges, such as her teacher, Mr. Wardin, and her friends dropping out of school due to poor grades, and family issues. During the summer, she does a report on Malcolm X that changes how she thinks about school. Theresa is then forced to make new friends, such as Devon, a tough but intelligent guy that everyone respects. A few weeks before school starts, however, Devon is attacked by a gang, which leaves Theresa to fill out all of his college applications.

See also

 The Hoopster - The first book of the trilogy
 Homeboyz - The following book in the trilogy

References

External links
 Hip Hop High School Official Site
 Disney Hyperion biography of Author Alan Lawrence Sitomer
 
 
 Scholastic 6 Part Video Interview with Author Alan Lawrence Sitomer

2006 American novels
Urban fiction
African-American young adult novels
Hip hop books
The Hoopster
Novels set in high schools and secondary schools
2006 children's books